Social Europe (ISSN 2628-7641), is a leading European digital media publisher and a forum for debate and innovative thinking. Social Europe states about itself that it uses the values of freedom, sustainability and equality as the foundation on which its contributors examine important policy issues. Social Europe was founded by Henning Meyer and is focused on publishing new and pioneering answers to issues in economics, politics and employment & labor.

Social Europe is published by Social Europe Publishing & Consulting GmbH based in Berlin. Between 2005 and 2018 Social Europe was published from London.

Social Europe is the winner of an 2018 .eu Web Award in the House of EU category. The House of EU award presented annually by EURid celebrates the best website that represent blogs, news outlets, and the media. The 2018 .eu Web Awards competition recorded over 200 nominations with close to 10.000 votes during the nomination and voting period. The winners were announced at the 2018 awards gala, which took place at the Theatre du Vaudeville in Brussels on 21 November 2018.

Since its foundation, Social Europe has published high-profile authors such as Zygmunt Bauman Sheri Berman, Jayati Gosh, Jürgen Habermas, Michael Higgins, Paul Mason, and Adam Tooze. Articles published on Social Europe have been commented on or referenced in publications such as The Atlantic, The Guardian, Harvard Business Review and Die Zeit.

References

External links
 
 Social Europe Mission Statement

Publishing companies of Europe
Mass media companies of Europe
Mass media in Europe
Media freedom in Europe